Nik is a unisex given name and a short form of most names starting with Nik, derived from Ancient Greek νικη (nike) meaning "victory".

Nik (نیک) is also an Iranian name, it is a boy's name, meaning: good, pleasant, nice.

It may refer to:

People:
Nik Bärtsch (born 1971), Swiss pianist, composer and producer
Nik Bonitto (born 1999), American football player
Nik Caner-Medley (born 1983), American basketball player
Nik Cohn (born 1946), British rock journalist
Nik Kershaw (born 1958), English singer-songwriter, composer, musician and record producer
Nik Lewis (born June 3, 1982), American gridiron football player and coach
Nik Needham (born 1996), American football player
Nik Omladič (born 1989), Slovenian footballer
Nik Richie (born Hooman Karamian in 1979), American blogger, author and Internet personality
Nik Stauskas (born 1993), Canadian National Basketball Association player
Nik Turner (born 1940), English musician
Nik Wallenda (born 1979), American acrobat, aerialist, daredevil, high wire artist and author
Nik Welter (1871 – 1951), Luxembourgish writer and politician
Nik Xhelilaj (born 1983), Albanian film and stage actor
Nik Zagranitchni (born 1969), Israeli Olympic wrestler
Nik Abdul Aziz Nik Mat (1931-2015), Malaysian politician and Muslim cleric
Nik Ahmad Fadly Nik Leh (born 1977), Malaysian former footballer
Nik Nazmi Nik Ahmad (born 1982), Malaysian politician
Nik Shahrul Azim Abdul Halim (born 1990), Malaysian footballer
Cristian Dzwonik (born 1971), Argentinean cartoonist better known as Nik, creator of Gaturro
 one half of the Danish R&B/hip-hop/pop duo Nik & Jay, real name Niclas Genckel Petersen
Nik P., Austrian schlager singer Nikolaus Presnik (born 1962)

Other:  
 One of the three 2002 FIFA World Cup mascots
 Nomor Induk Kependudukan, the national single identity number of Indonesian identity card

See also
Nick (given name)

Unisex given names
Hypocorisms